Dean Allan Wilkins (born August 24, 1966), is a professional baseball player who played pitcher in the Major Leagues from 1989 to 1991. He played for the Chicago Cubs and Houston Astros.

External links

1966 births
Major League Baseball pitchers
Chicago Cubs players
Houston Astros players
Living people
Baseball players from Illinois
People from Blue Island, Illinois
Albany-Colonie Yankees players
El Paso Diablos players
Fort Lauderdale Yankees players
Iowa Cubs players
Las Vegas Stars (baseball) players
Oneonta Yankees players
Pittsfield Cubs players
San Bernardino Spirit players
Tucson Toros players
Wichita Wranglers players
Winston-Salem Spirits players